Plagiodera is a genus of Chrysomelinae (a subfamily of leaf beetles).

Selected species
 Plagiodera arizonae Crotch, 1873 i c g b
 Plagiodera cajennensis Fabricius, 1798 g
 Plagiodera californica (Rogers, 1856) i c g b
 Plagiodera septemvittata Stal, 1858 g
 Plagiodera thymaloides Stål, 1860 i c g b
 Plagiodera versicolora (Laicharting, 1781) i c g b (imported willow leaf beetle)
Data sources: i = ITIS, c = Catalogue of Life, g = GBIF, b = Bugguide.net

References

Chrysomelidae genera
Chrysomelinae
Taxa named by Louis Alexandre Auguste Chevrolat